Kilmovee is a village and civil parish in County Mayo, Ireland. It is a mainly rural parish on the R325 road, midway between Kilkelly and Ballaghaderreen.

In March 2004, the Cois Tine Heritage Centre was opened and since then it has become a cultural centre for the people of the area. In 2011, the Annual Seosamh Mac Gabhann Summer School was established in Kilmovee to honour the Irish language playwright and music teacher Seosamh Mac Gabhann, who lived and worked in Kilmovee for much of his life.

History
In pre-Norman Ireland, the lands of Kilmovee formed part of the Kingdom of Sliabh Lugha, a territory ruled by the O'Gadhra Dynasty. Sliabh Lugha was a subdivision of the larger Gailenga kingdom, from which derives the modern name Gallen.

After the Norman Invasion, the parish of Kilmovee became part of the Barony of Costello. The Nangle or de Angelo invaders came southwest from the De Lacy territory in Carrick-on-Shannon and forced the O'Gadhras from their stronghold in Airtech Mór, building their own castle there in 1225. It became known as Castlemore and the region was sometimes called Castlemore-MacCostello.

{{blockquote|Coolavin - The sept of O'Gara were given as Lord of Cuil Obh-Finn (Prince of Coolavin) and of Sliabh Lugha which was part of the Barony of Costello in Co. Mayo, where they had spread in the 13th century. O'Gara was seated at Moygara castle. By the 13th century the MacDermots became lords of Coolavin.|source=Ireland's History in Maps}}

The Annals of Connacht mention a skirmish which took place in Clooncara, Kilmovee in 1464:

Samuel Lewis's Topographical Dictionary of Ireland, published in 1837, gives the following account of Kilmovee:

Archaeological sites
An ogham stone found in a wall in Kilmovee is now mounted beside "The Three Wells." "The Three Wells" are reputed to have sprung up when St. Mobhi struck the ground with his staff when he had no water to baptise the local people.

According to the Celtic Inscribed Stones Project the inscription is somewhat damaged but the legible part reads: "ALATTOS MAQI BR"[--.

The parish of Kilmovee has several Iron Age stone forts in various states, including Kilcashel Stone Fort.

Built heritage
The Glebe
The residence of the Protestant Rector for Ballaghaderreen. When the French army was marching east from Killala to Longford, the battalion came through Kilmovee to cross the River Lung. Local farmers joined the battalion to fight off the enemy. When the battalion was defeated, the local farmers’ lands were confiscated and given to the Protestant Church.

Church of Mobhí
Kilmovee is known in Irish as Cill Mobhí (Church of Mobhí). Mobhí was known as "Mobhí the Teacher" and is believed to have died in 544 AD. The name Mobhí is a pet form of the name Berchán''. A pestilence which devastated Ireland in 544 caused the dispersion of Mobhi's disciples, and Columba returned to Ulster.

Old RIC Barrack
According to the 1901 Census of the United Kingdom there were three Royal Irish Constabulary barracks in the parish of Kilmovee; one in Kilkelly, one at Rathnagussaun and one at Sraheens. The Barracks at Sraheens is still standing though now derelict. During the War of Independence, in June 1921, the RIC barracks at Sraheens was subjected to sniper fire from the Kilkelly Company of the East Mayo IRA under the command of Mick Moffett. One Black and Tans soldier was wounded during the operation and as a result the barracks was abandoned.

20th century
In 1975, Kilmovee teacher Seosamh Mac Gabhann set up a Senior Céilí Band in Kilmovee, named Ceoltóirí Mobhí. The band gained recognition with two of their jigs, known as "The Kilmovee Jigs". In 1977 one of the first rural swimming pools in Ireland was opened in Kilmovee.

Sport
An annual charity running event, the Kilmovee 10K began in April 2010. It has been called "the flattest 10k in Ireland" and has attracted runners from all over the country.

Kilmovee Shamrocks is the local GAA club. The Shamrocks have competed in county and regional competitions. Some of these club's Ladies' Gaelic football players have won All-Ireland titles with the Mayo senior and minor teams and at other levels. Kilmovee GAA won the under-21 Mayo final in September 2007 for the first time. The Shamrocks also won the Under 18 title for the third time in a row in October 2007.

Townlands
Townlands in the area include:

References

External links
Kilmovee Community Council
YouTube video of a drive through Kilmovee
1901 Census of Kilmovee. Search for Kilmovee in the Parish box
Griffith's Valuation: Kilmovee 1856-1857
Tithe Applotments - Kilmovee Civil Parish 1825
Kilkelly Ireland letters and song
Survey Maps of Kilmovee townlands

Civil parishes of County Mayo
Towns and villages in County Mayo